Croatian singer Luka Nižetić has released six studio albums, one live album and 41 singles.

Nižetić's debut studio album Premijera was released in 2005 and spawned four singles. His second album titled Slobodno dišem was released in 2007 and spawned four singles. A year later in 2008, Nižetić released his third album, Na tren i zauvijek. The album peaked in the top 20 in Croatian and spawned five singles. In the 2010's he released two studio albums; Kad zasvira... in 2013 and Ljubav je mukte in 2018. Nižetić's sixth studio album Ludilo brale was released in late 2022.

During his career Nižetić released multiple top 10 singles. Among some of his highest charting singles are "U snovima", "Ludilo brale" and "Ae", respectively. Although, not a charting song due to the lack of an official singles chart in 2006, "Prava ljubav", a collaboration with Croatian singer Lana Jurčević, is considered to be both of the artists' signature song.

Albums

Studio albums

Live albums

Singles

Videography

Music videos

References

Discographies of Croatian artists
Pop music discographies